Ipswich was an electoral district for the Legislative Assembly in the Australian state of New South Wales created for the July 1859 election, partly replacing Stanley Boroughs and including Ipswich. It was abolished in December 1859 as a result of the separation of Queensland.

Members for Ipswich

Election results

1859 

Benjamin Cribb was the member for Stanley Boroughs.

References

Former electoral districts of New South Wales
Electoral districts of New South Wales in the area of Queensland
History of Queensland
1859 establishments in Australia
Constituencies established in 1859
1859 disestablishments in Australia
Constituencies disestablished in 1859